Collective Soul is an American rock band.

Collective Soul is also the name of:
Collective Soul (1995 album), a self-titled album by Collective Soul, also known as The Blue Album
Collective Soul (2009 album), a self-titled album by Collective Soul, also known as Rabbit

See also 
Collective Soul discography

Collective Soul